Stanger is a surname. Notable people with the surname include:

 Allison Stanger (born 1960), American political scientist and professor
 George Eaton Stanger (1816-1892), English surgeon
 Henry Yorke Stanger (1849-1929), English politician and judge
 Ian Stanger (born 1971), Scottish cricketer
 Kyle Stanger (21st century), British child voice actor
 Nina Stanger (1943–1999), British lawyer
 Patti Stanger (born 1961), American television personality
 Tony Stanger (born 1968), Scottish international rugby union player
 William Stanger (footballer) (born 1985), footballer for SJA Le Poiré-sur-Vie
 William Stanger (surveyor), surveyor-general in South Africa
 Ryan Stanger (action boy) (born 1979), Actor and podcast host for ‘Action Boyz’ and ‘The Dumbbells’.

See also 
 St. Anger

German-language surnames
Surnames of Scottish origin